This is a comparison of notable GIS software. To be included on this list, the software must have a linked existing article.

License, source, & operating system support

Pure server

Map servers

Map caches

Pure web client

Libraries

See also
 Open Source Geospatial Foundation (OSGeo)
 Geographic information system software
 GIS Live DVD

References

GIS software
GIS